Lysmata is a genus of shrimp in the infraorder Caridea, the caridean shrimp. The genus belongs to the family Lysmatidae. Lysmata are popular ornamental shrimp in the marine aquarium trade for their bright color patterns, interesting behaviors, and ability to control certain aquarium pests such as sea anemones of the genus Aiptasia. They are known to command high prices on the pet market.
 
The genus is informally divided into two main categories. Some species are cleaner shrimp which "clean" parasites and other material from fish, live in pairs, and are brightly colored, often in contrasting reds and yellows with white antennae. Other species are the "peppermint shrimp", which have semi-translucent, red-banded bodies, and live in large groups. Some peppermint shrimp perform cleaning behaviors, but less actively than do the cleaner shrimp.

The genus has been studied with interest due to its unusual sexual system, protandric simultaneous hermaphroditism. While some other taxa of shrimp undergo sequential hermaphroditism, they have only been observed changing from male to female. In Lysmata, males become true hermaphrodites instead of females. So far, every species studied has been confirmed to have this sexual system. During their "female phase" they actually have functioning male and female tissues in their gonads and produce both types of gamete. When paired, they take turns fertilizing each other's eggs.

Lysmata occur in the tropics and in warmer temperate waters. They usually live on rock and coral reefs, in shallow and deeper areas. Some live in sponges.

Species
Lysmata contains the following species:

Lysmata amboinensis (De Man, 1888)
Lysmata anchisteus Chace, 1972
Lysmata ankeri Rhyne & Lin, 2006
Lysmata argentopunctata Wicksten, 2000
Lysmata bahia Rhyne & Lin, 2006
Lysmata boggessi Rhyne & Lin, 2006
Lysmata californica (Stimpson, 1866)
Lysmata chica Wicksten, 2000
Lysmata debelius Bruce, 1983
Lysmata dispar Hayashi, 2007
Lysmata galapagensis Schmitt, 1924
Lysmata grabhami (Gordon, 1935)
Lysmata gracilirostris Wicksten, 2000
Lysmata guamensis Anker & Cox, 2011
Lysmata hochi Baeza & Anker, 2008
Lysmata holthuisi Anker, Baeza & De Grave, 2009
Lysmata intermedia (Kingsley, 1878)
Lysmata jundalini Rhyne, Calado & Santos, 2012
Lysmata kempi Chace, 1997
Lysmata kuekenthali (De Man, 1902)
Lysmata lipkei Okuno & Fiedler, 2011
Lysmata moorei (Rathbun, 1901)
Lysmata morelandi (Yaldwyn, 1971)
Lysmata multiscissa (Nobili, 1904)
Lysmata nayaritensis Wicksten, 2000
Lysmata nilita P. F. R. Dohrn & Holthuis, 1950
Lysmata olavoi Fransen, 1991
Lysmata pederseni Rhyne & Lin, 2006
Lysmata philippinensis Chace, 1997
Lysmata porteri (Rathbun, 1907)
Lysmata rafa Rhyne & Anker, 2007
Lysmata rathbunae Chace, 1970
Lysmata rauli Laubenheimer & Rhyne, 2010
Lysmata seticaudata (Risso, 1816)
Lysmata splendida Burukovsky, 2000
Lysmata stenolepis Crosnier & Forest, 1973
Lysmata ternatensis De Man, 1902
Lysmata trisetacea (Heller, 1861)
Lysmata udoi Baeza, Bolaños, Hernandez & López, 2009
Lysmata uncicornis Holthuis & Maurin, 1952
Lysmata vittata (Stimpson, 1860)
Lysmata wurdemanni (Gibbes, 1850)
Lysmata zacae Armstrong, 1941

Notes

References

External links

Alpheoidea